SimpliSafe is an American home security company based in Boston, Massachusetts. The company produces and sells self-installed wireless security systems.

History
SimpliSafe was founded in 2006 by then-Harvard Business School students, Chad and Eleanor Laurans, after several friends in the Cambridge area experienced break-ins, but couldn't find a security company that was designed to help renters. Prior to Harvard, Mr Laurans attended Yale, where he majored in electrical engineering and graduated in 2000.

The couple worked on SimpliSafe in their own home from 2006 to 2008. Mr Laurans designed the system and tested it at friends’ residences for feedback. SimpliSafe launched in 2009 with initial funding from angel investors.

In 2010, revenue for the company was $1.4 million. In 2013 revenue was $38.5 million.

In May 2014, Sequoia Capital invested $57 million in SimpliSafe through a Series A round of funding. The same year, the company was reported to have more than 100,000 customers and was listed as the second-fastest growing company in the Boston area on the Inc. 5000 list.

In 2015, SimpliSafe grew from 100 employees to about 250 employees, and was reported to have 300,000 customers.

In February 2016, independent security firm IOActive identified a potential RF system vulnerability that could be used to target Simplisafe and other RF-based monitoring systems, allowing them to be disabled. The company acknowledged the vulnerability, stating it was not unique to SimpliSafe alarms and is inherent of other systems using similar technology. 

In June 2017, SimpliSafe launched its SimpliCam security camera. In December, the Boston-based alternative newspaper DigBoston reported that SimpliSafe employees faced politically charged harassment in one of SimpliSafe's warehouses and its Boston call center. The article described complaints of racist and hostile behavior from managers towards workers, and attributed it to the company's conservative culture. The harassment included managers and other employees sharing images of the conservative symbol Pepe the Frog and other references to the Alt-right, including those that showed support for President Trump. According to the article, workers who complained about these "openly racist and extremely hostile" managers, were targeted with further harassment, while one of the managers was promoted.

In January 2018 at the Consumer Electronics Show (CES), the company introduced the third generation version of its product line, allowing over the air updates of the technology to address the RF vulnerability. The system was designed in conjunction with design firm IDEO. In February 2018, in the wake of the Stoneman Douglas High School shooting, SimpliSafe came under pressure from gun control activists for offering a monitoring discount to National Rifle Association members. On February 23, 2018, SimpliSafe announced it was discontinuing its relationship with the NRA. On June 29, SimpliSafe announced that private equity firm Hellman & Friedman had taken a controlling interest in the company, in a deal that valued the company at $1B. In October, the company launched its Video Doorbell Pro.

On August 21, 2019, SimpliSafe announced the launch of its Smart Lock. In December, the company announced Christian Cerda as its new CEO.

By February 2020, Simplisafe had 800 employees, and announced a second call center was opening in the Richmond, Virginia area, adding an additional 500 jobs.

Products and services

System overview
SimpliSafe systems include a base unit and a keypad, and a variety of peripheral wireless accessories and sensors including video doorbells, smart locks, door sensors, motion detectors, smoke detectors, glassbreak sensors and temperature monitors.  Systems are designed to be self-installed. Previous systems worked on a cellular connection, while the third generation system runs off of both cellular and Wi-Fi. The wireless system runs on lithium batteries, and can't be disabled by cutting the user's power. As a standalone product, SimpliSafe systems function as a noise-only alarm system, emitting a 85-decibel siren. Monitoring services are provided for a monthly fee. 

SimpliCam cameras - SimpliSafe systems support up to four cameras, or the cameras can function as standalone devices.

Video Doorbell Pro - SimpliSafe's Video Doorbell Pro includes an HD camera, a heat sensor, and built-in microphones. The Video Doorbell Pro additionally supports two-way audio with the SimpliSafe App on iOS and Android. 

Smart Lock - Simplisafe offers a Smart Lock that can be user installed, and controlled using a smartphone with the SimpliSafe app. A black PIN pad is included for unlocking the door from outside. The Smart Lock communicates with the system and PIN pad via an RF radio.

Integrations
In 2016, SimpliSafe integrated with the Nest Learning Thermostat.

On April 10, 2018, SimpliSafe also integrated with August Smart Lock, allowing SimpliSafe users to lock and unlock their door automatically upon arming and disarming their system, respectively.  SimpliSafe also integrated with Amazon Alexa in 2018. Alexa users are able to check their system status with voice commands, as well as arm — but not disarm — their system.  On Sep 19, 2018, SimpliSafe integrated with Google Assistant. As with Alexa, SimpliSafe users can check their system status or arm their system with voice commands.

Recognition
In 2020, American media website CNET named SimpliSafe the best do-it-yourself alarm system. CNET named SimpliSafe best system again in 2021.

References

External links
 Official website

2018 mergers and acquisitions
Companies based in Boston
Security companies of the United States
Technology companies established in 2006